Lisa Armstrong may refer to:
 Lisa Armstrong (writer), British author 
 Lisa Armstrong (make-up artist) (born 1976), British make-up artist